Alfred Gavin Maddock (1917–2009) was an English inorganic chemist, radiochemist and spectroscopist who worked on the Tube Alloys Project and the Manhattan Project during World War II. Those projects resulted in the development of the atomic bomb. He may be best known for, during World War II, spilling Canada's entire supply of  plutonium which was 10 milligrams onto a wooden laboratory bench, and for recovered 9 and a half milligrams of plutonium. He recovered it by wet chemistry. He also had a distinguished, though less eventful, post-war academic career.

Biography

Maddock was born in Bedford Park, a garden suburb of London, and was educated at Latymer Upper School. He won a state scholarship to study chemistry at the Royal College of Science (RCS), then a constituent part of Imperial College London. After his undergraduate education, he continued on to postgraduate studies at RCS under the supervision of inorganic chemist Professor H. J. Emeléus. Those studies related to silicon hydrides, and he was awarded his PhD in 1942.

During the early years of World War II, his other studies included methods of protection against arsine, which had been proposed as a chemical warfare agent. He also studied the toxicity of volatile compounds of fluorine; which resulted in his suffering an acute case of poisoning. He and Lord Rothschild devised a device based on mercuric chloride which was used by Allied parachutists into France.

In 1941, he got to know several French nuclear physicists from the Curie Institute in Paris who had escaped the Nazi invasion. He initially worked with them at the Cavendish Laboratory in Cambridge, and later moved with them and others to Ottawa, Canada, where he helped build a heavy water reactor, as part of what was first known as the Tube Alloys Project and later as the Manhattan Project. It was during that time that he spilled Canada's supply of plutonium (about 10 mg) onto a wooden laboratory bench. He pragmatically sawed it into pieces, ashed them, and recovered the plutonium by wet chemistry.

After the War, he returned to England; was appointed lecturer in the Department of Chemistry at the University of Cambridge, where Emeléus now occupied the chair of inorganic chemistry; and was elected Fellow of St Catharine's College.

He had a broad range of scientific interests, which included: the chemistry of the actinide elements, in particular plutonium and protactinium; the chemistry associated with nuclear transformation; solvent extraction; radiation of inorganic solids; the chemistry of positronium ions; and Mössbauer spectroscopy, in which he was a pioneer. He was consultant to the International Atomic Energy Agency, and to atomic energy projects in various countries. He published more than 300 scientific papers.

Honours and awards
These include:
 1960Awarded DSc and a personal readership by the University of Cambridge
 Awarded DSc honoris causa by the University of Louvain, Belgium
 Elected to the Brazilian Academy of Sciences; in 1995, awarded by it its Grand Cross of the Order of Merit in Science
 From 1981President of St Catharine's College, Cambridge
 1996Awarded the Becquerel Medal of the Royal Society of Chemistry

Notes

References

Further reading and external links
The Papers of Alfred Maddock held at the Churchill Archives Centre
 
 
 
 
 
 ; from the Periodic Videos series, dated 5 September 2008; in which Professor Sir Martyn Poliakoff, who studied under Maddock, recounts the laboratory bench anecdote.

1917 births
2009 deaths
People from the London Borough of Ealing
People educated at Latymer Upper School
Alumni of Imperial College London
Alumni of the Royal College of Science
Fellows of St Catharine's College, Cambridge
Members of the Brazilian Academy of Sciences
20th-century British chemists
Inorganic chemists
Spectroscopists